Choi Jung-in (born December 7, 1980), also known mononymously as Jung-in, is a South Korean singer of Jungle Entertainment. She debuted in Leessang's "Rush" and was once part of the five-member group G.Fla until disbanding after three years. Her first album From Andromeda was released on March 11, 2010. On April 5, she released Melody Remedy.
She is a former elite swimmer.

Career

2002–2007: Debut and G.Fla
She debuted in a collaboration with Leessang for the song "Rush". She would later join the five-member R&B group, G.Fla, consisting of herself, Geol, Jung Soo-young, Jung Hee-young and Kim Ji-in. In 2004, G.Fla released their first album Groove Flamingo on September 16. Their last album together, 음악하는 여자, was released on September 5, 2007.

Personal life
Choi is married to singer Jo Jung-chi. Their first child, a daughter, was born in February 2017. They briefly joined the cast of The Return of Superman in May 2018. The couple's second child, a son, was born on December 13, 2019.

Discography

Extended plays

Singles

Soundtrack appearances

Compilation appearances

Awards
 Cyworld Digital Music Awards (2009) - Collaboration Award

Music programs

Show! Music Core 

|-  
| 2014
| June 7
| "Your Scent" (with Gary)
|}

References

External links
Official YouTube

1980 births
Living people
K-pop singers
South Korean women pop singers
Jungle Entertainment artists
South Korean female idols
Mystic Entertainment artists
21st-century South Korean singers
21st-century South Korean women singers